Deir Jannine   is a  town in Akkar Governorate, Lebanon, close to the border with Syria.

The population in Deir Jannine are mostly Maronite.

Deir Jenin is about 125 km (77.675 mi) from Beirut, the capital of Lebanon. It rises about 390 m  (1,279.59 ft - 426,504 yd) above sea level and extends over an area estimated at 584 hectares (5.84 km² - 2.25424 mi² .

History
In 1838, Eli Smith noted  the village as Deir Jenin,  whose inhabitants were Maronites, located east of esh-Sheikh Mohammed.

References

Bibliography

External links
Deir Jannine, Localiban 

Populated places in Akkar District
Maronite Christian communities in Lebanon